Favorita  may refer to:
 a palace in Vienna, see : Diplomatic Academy of Vienna#Location and Premises
 Favorita (grape), an Italian grape variety
 A Favorita, a popular and award-winning telenovela, first broadcast in Brazil at Rede Globo in 2008